The first election to the Neath Port Talbot County Borough Council was held on 4 May 1995.  It was followed by the 1999 election.  On the same day there were elections to  the other 21 local authorities in Wales and community councils in Wales.

Overview
All council seats were up for election. These were the first elections held following local government reorganisation and the abolition of West Glamorgan County Council. The ward boundaries for the new authority were based on the previous Lliw Valley Borough Council, Neath Borough Council and Swansea City Council although the number of members elected for individual wards was reduced. Conservative candidates were heavily defeated.

|}

Candidates
Most sitting members of West Glamorgan County council sought election to the new authority. A number were also members of the previous district councils but others contested a ward against a sitting district councillor.

Results

Aberavon (three seats)

Aberdulais (one seat)

Alltwen (one seat)

Baglan (three seats)

Blaengwrach (one seat)

Briton Ferry East (one seat)

Briton Ferry West (one seat)

Bryn and Cwmavon (three seats)

Bryncoch North (one seat)

Bryncoch South (two seats)

Cadoxton (one seat)

Cimla (two seats)

Coedffranc Central (two seats)

|- style="background-color:#F6F6F6" 
! style="background-color: white" | 
| colspan="5" | Others win (new seat)
|-

Coedffranc North (one seat)

Coedffranc West (one seat)

Crynant (one seat)

Cwmllynfell (one seat)

Cymmer (one seat)

Dyffryn (one seat)

Glyncorrwg  (one seat)

Glynneath (two seats)

Godre'r Graig (one seat)

Gwaun Cae Gurwen (one seat)

Gwynfi (one seat)

|- style="background-color:#F6F6F6" 
! style="background-color: white" | 
| colspan="5" | Others win (new seat)
|-

Lower Brynamman (one seat)

Margam (one seat)

Neath East (three seats)

Neath North (two seats)

Neath South (two seats)

Onllwyn (one seat)

Pelenna (one seat)

Pontardawe (two seats)

Port Talbot (three seats)

|- style="background-color:#F6F6F6" 
! style="background-color: white" | 
| colspan="5" | Others win (new seat)
|-

Resolven (one seat)

Rhos (one seat)

Sandfields East (three seats)

Sandfields West (three seats)

Seven Sisters (one seat)

Taibach (two seats)

Tonna (one seat)

Trebanos (one seat)

Ystalyfera (one seat)

References

1995 Welsh local elections
1995